Michael Belmore  (born 1971) is a Canadian sculptor of Anishinaabe descent who works primarily in resistant stone, copper and other metals.

Belmore's works are in museum collections in both Canada and the United States, and he has held exhibitions in both nations.

Artistic career 
Michael Belmore graduated from the Ontario College of Art and Design in 1994 and completed his Masters of Fine Arts at the University of Ottawa in 2019. He is a member of the Royal Canadian Academy of Arts and represented in public collections including the National Gallery of Canada, the McMichael Canadian Art Collection, Agnes Etherington Art Centre, National Museum of the American Indian – Smithsonian Museum, and the Art Gallery of Ontario.

Belmore has staged over ten solo exhibitions and has participated in more than fifteen group shows, including Into the Woods: Two Icons Revisited (2015 Art Gallery of Ontario), Changing Hands: Art without Reservation (2012 Museum of Art & Design), Close Encounters: The Next 500 Years (2011 Winnipeg), HIDE: Skin as Material and Metaphor (2010 National Museum of the American Indian), and Terra Incognita (2007 Macdonald Stewart Art Centre).

Working in resistant stone, copper and other metals, Belmore's process is intricate and time-consuming. Given his deliberate and thoughtful pace, his sculptures and installations are founded on a deep understanding of the qualities – physical and symbolic – of the materials. Curator Olexander Wlasenko has described his approach as “alchemic; vacillating between determination and serendipity. Human intervention into the landscape comes with and without consequence."

Selected solo exhibitions 
2020 – Michael Belmore, Art Gallery of Ontario, Toronto, ON

2018 – thunder sky turbulent water, Central Art Garage, Ottawa, ON

2017 – mskwibloodsang, Karsh-Masson Gallery, Ottawa, ON

2016 – fenda, Nogueira da Silva Museum, Braga, Portugal

2015 – Michael Belmore, Royal Melbourne Institute of Technologies Project Space Gallery, Melbourne, Australia

2013 – Toil, Woodstock Art Gallery, Woodstock, ON

2009 – Embankment, Station Gallery, Whitby, ON

2006 – Downstream, Forest City Gallery, London, ON

2005 – Stream, Rails End Gallery & Arts Centre, Haliburton, ON

2002 – Vantage Point, Sacred Circle Gallery of American Indian Art, Seattle, Washington

2001 – fly by wire, AKA Artist-Run Centre/Tribe, Saskatoon, SK

2000 – Eating Crow, Sâkêwêwak Artists’ Collective, Regina, SK

1999 – Ravens Wait, Indian Art Centre, Hull, QC

References 

1971 births
Living people
Canadian sculptors
OCAD University alumni
20th-century Canadian male artists
21st-century Canadian male artists
20th-century First Nations sculptors
21st-century First Nations people
Members of the Royal Canadian Academy of Arts